Munawar is a given name and a surname. People with the name include:

Given name
 Munawwar Rana Indian poet
Munawar Faruqui (born 1992), Indian stand-up comedian
 Munawar Ahmed Gill (born 1956), Pakistani politician
 Munawar Hasan (1941–2020), Pakistani politician
 Munawar Hussain (1914–2003), Pakistani cricket umpire
 Munawar Iqbal (born 1948), Pakistani tennis player
 Munawar Khan, Pakistani politician
 Munawar Ali Khan (1930–1989), Indian singer
 Munawar Humayun Khan, Indian not-for-profit executive
 Munawar Sultana (1924–2007), Indian actress
 Munawar Ali Wassan, Pakistani politician
 Munawar uz-Zaman (1950–1994), Pakistani field hockey player 
 Munawar Zarif (1940–1976), Pakistani actor and comedian

Surname
 Agil Munawar (born 1996), Indonesian footballer 
 Raheela Yahya Munawar (born 1957), Pakistani politician 
 Rezwan Munawar (born 1964), Pashto folklore singer
 Sheheryar Munawar (born 1988), Pakistani actor and film producer
 Yandi Munawar (born 1992), Indonesian footballer